Pandit Puttaraj Gawayigalu (3 March 1914 – 17 September 2010) was an Indian musician in the Hindustani classical tradition, a scholar who authored more than 80 books in Kannada, Sanskrit and Hindi, a music teacher and a social servant. A member of the Gwalior Gharana (school), he is renowned for his ability to play many instruments such as the veena, the tabla, mridangam, violin etc., as well as for his popular renditions of devotional music (bhajans) vachanas.A famous vocalist both in Hindustani and Carnatic Music. He is the recipient of the Padma Bhushan, India's third highest civilian honour, awarded in 2010.

Early life
He was born into a poor Kannada Lingayat family in Devagiri in Haveri taluk of Dharwad district (now in Haveri district) of Karnataka. His parents were Revaiah Venkatapurmath and Siddamma. He lost his eyesight at the age of 6. He lost his parents when he was 10 months old. His maternal uncle Chandrashekharaiah took him under his wings and raised him.

Musical training

Seeing Gawai's interest in music,when he was playing a harmonium of his uncle his uncle took him to Veereshwara Punyashrama, run by Ganayogi Panchakshara Gawai. Under the guidance of Panchakshara Gawai, he mastered Hindustani. He mastered carnatic music under the guidance of Mundarigi Raghavendrachar (belonging to Vishesha Parampara). He had mastered many instruments harmonium, tabla, violin and 10 other music instruments.

Theatre
Puttaraj Gawai set up a theater company which would not only to help in raising funds to provide free food, shelter, education to disabled orphans but also to contribute to the theater culture. Thus,"SriGuru Kumareshwara Krupa Poshita Natya Company "was established. His first play 'Sri Sivayogi Sidharama' written and directed by him brought in profit and was applauded. This was followed by many other successful productions.

Literature
Puttaraj Gawai has authored over 80 books on spirituality, religion, history as well as biographies of many 'sharanas' of the Bhakti movement of the 12th century. He has authored books in Kannada, Hindi and Sanskrit. He re-wrote the Bhagavad Gita in Braille script.

Social service
Puttaraja Gawai is one of the pioneers of Veereshwara Punyashrama, a music school dedicated to imparting musical knowledge to people who are differentially able-d. Disabled people, especially blind from all castes, religions and sections of the society are taught music in the ashram.
Pt. Dr. Puttaraj Kavi Gavai has been the pontiff of Shree Veereshwara Punyashrama Since 1944, after the demise of Pt. Panchakshara Gavai who founded this Ashrama for the upliftment of the born-blind children and orphans. Since its inception in 1942, Shree Veereshwar Punyashrama has been feeding and educating the born-blind and the orphans and the poor children free of cost, without discrimination on the basis of caste and creed. The Ashrama is solely run on the strength of voluntary donations by its devotees.
The mission of the Ashrama is selfless service to the community, especially and poorest and the blind. The disciples trained and educated in Music. and Fine Arts have become music teachers, stage-artists, radio-artists, musicians and professionals in the field of arts in thousands.
"Pt. Panchakshari Gavai Drama Theatre" organized and founded by Pt.
Puttaraj Gavai has given innumerable performances and has been considered one of the pioneering feats of Theatre Movement in the North Karnataka. Being solely dedicated to furthering the art of stage drama, this dramatic company has produced thousands of stage artists who have earned national and international fame.
Punyashrama has produced thousands of "Kirtanakaras" who are busy delivering Puranas and Pravachanas and Keertanas all over the state. Thus, Shree Veereshwara Punyashrama is rendering valuable services in the field of literature, music, religion, literacy and social service. It is dedicated to the cause of the welfare of the blind and down-trodden for over seventy years in its own humble way. The very secular credentials of this institution has made this Ashrama typical and a class by itself.
The Pontiff of Shree Veereshwara Punyashrama, Gadag is viewed by the devotees as a "Walking God on the Earth".
Shree Veereshwara Punyashrama of Gadag is a very popular and influential Ashrama in Karnataka. It is a charity institution solely dedicated to the upliftment of the blind, orphans and poor children. More than 1000 children reside in the Ashrama and are fed free of cost. The Ashrama runs Thirteen institutions comprising musical as well as general education.

Shree Veereshwara Punyashrama is run on its own strength without any aid from the Government. It has been contributing to the society the talented musicians, radioartists, music teachers, stage - artists and the professionals in the field of music and fine arts.
Shree Veereshwara Punyashrama is thoroughtly a secular institution and admits students from all sections of society without discrimination on the basis of caste and creed.

The pontiff, Pt. Puttaraj Kavi Gavai has been serving out society in different capacities and is a catalyst of social and communal harmony. He richly deserves any coveted prize and honour like "Padma Vibhushan Award".

Students
Gawai has taught many students which presently runs to a count of more than 1000 visually impaired. he was a great singer
Some of his well-known students are:
Chandrashekhar Puranikmath.
S. Ballesh
Veerashwar Madri
Rajguru Guruswami Kalikeri,
Venkatesh Kumar

Death

He died 17 September 2010, at Veereshwara Punyashrama, Gadag, Karnataka. He was buried at the ashram as per the veerashaiva traditions with respectful government honours. More than 1 million devotees attended his funeral ceremony in Gadag on 18 September 2010. The Karnataka state government declared state mourning on Saturday and holiday for government offices as a mark of respect to the multi-faceted personality.

Literary works
Some of his important works are listed below.

Books on music
Sangeet Shastra Jnana
Tabla Shikshaka
GuruSudha Part 1 & 2
Taala Panchakshara

Books in Kannada
Akkamahadevi Purana
Haveri Shivabasava Purana
Ankalagi Adavi Siddeswara Purana
Huchala Guru Siddeshwara Purana
Purathanara Purana
Veerabhadreshwara Purana
Kalikeri Guru Mahima Purana
Sharana Basaveshwara Purana
Sri Ankalagi Adiveshwara Puraana
Sri Haveri Shivabasava Swami Puraana
Guleda Gadilingeshwara Puraana
Sri Veerabhadreshwara Puraana
Shivasharane Hemareddi Mallamma Puraana
Chikkenakoppada Sri Channaveera Sharanara Puraana
Sri Naalatwaada Veereshwara Puraana
Sri Annadaaneshwara Puraana
Guddaapura Daanamma Devi Puraana
Sri Chikkeshwara Puraana
Sri Kalakeri Gurumahimaa Puraana

Books in Sanskrit
Shrimat Kumara Geetha
Kumareshwara Kavya
Shri Linga Sooktha
Tatparya Sahit Sri Rudra
Panchakshara Suprabhata

Books in Hindi
Basava Purana (President Award winner)
Siddha Linga Vijaya
Sidhantha Shikamani etc.

Theatre and drama in Kannada
Sri Kotturu Basaveshwara
Nelloora Numbiyaaka
Shivasharana Chennayya
Bhagavaan Basaveshwara
Sri Gurudarhsana
Hanagalla Kumareshwara Mahatme
Sri Shivayogi Siddharaameshwara
Shivayogi Moligi Maarayya
Shirahatti Sri Phakeereshwara Mahatme
Shivasharane Uditadi Akkamahadevi
Sati Sukanya
Daanaveera Shirasangi Lingarajaru
Maharati Bheeshma
Magana Prema
Devara Duddu

Books in Braille
 Bhagavad Geeta
 Upanishad
 Sri Rudra and Music

Awards and recognitions

Pt Gawai has been bestowed with many awards for his contributions to music, literature and social service. Some important awards are listed below.
 1961 - President award for "Basava Purana" in Hindi
 1962 - Kannada Kavi Kulottama by Kannada Sahitya Parishat, Bangalore
 1970 - Karnataka Rajyotsava Prashasti
 1975 - Honorary doctorate by Karnatak University
 1998 - Nadoja Prashasti
 1998 - Kanaka Purandara Prashasti
 1998 - Jnaanayogi by Kannada Sahitya Parishat, Gadag.
 1998 - Kendra Sangeet Natak Akademi Award
 1999 - Rajya Sangeeta Vidwan by Government of Karnataka
 2000 - National Award (for the betterment of disabilities) by Govt of India
 2001 - "Nadoja Award" from Kannada University
 2002 - Basavashree award
 2007 - Kalidas Samman by Government of Madhya Pradesh
 2007 - "Siddhashri Award" by Mugalkhod Jidaga Math (Add Arun S. Mathapati)
 2009 - N Vajrakumar Abhinandana Puraskar Samiti Award
 2009 - Tirumakudalu Chowdiah award by Government of Karnataka
 2010 - Padma Bhushan

References

External links
Official Web Site: PuttarajGavaiji, Veereshwar Punyashrama Gadag
Puttraj Gawai

1914 births
2010 deaths
Blind musicians
Hindustani singers
Kannada-language writers
Lingayatism
People from Gadag-Betageri
Recipients of the Padma Bhushan in arts
Recipients of the Padma Shri in arts
Recipients of the Sangeet Natak Akademi Award
Gwalior gharana
20th-century Indian musicians
Musicians from Karnataka
Writers from Karnataka
Hindi-language writers
Sanskrit writers